Portreeve is an unincorporated in the Rural Municipality of Clinworth No. 230, Saskatchewan, Canada. It previously held the status of village until December 31, 1972.

History 
Prior to December 31, 1972, Portreeve was incorporated as a village, and was restructured as an unincorporated community under the jurisdiction of the Rural Municipality of Clinworth No. 230 on that date.

Demographics

Notable people 
Clint Dunford, Canadian Politician.
Otto Albert Dunning, World War One Veteran

See also 
List of communities in Saskatchewan

References 

Clinworth No. 230, Saskatchewan
Former villages in Saskatchewan
Unincorporated communities in Saskatchewan
Populated places disestablished in 1972